Kourou Airport  is an airport serving Kourou, a commune of French Guiana. Kourou is the location of the Centre Spatial Guyanais (CSG), the French and European spaceport.

See also

 List of airports in French Guiana
 Transport in French Guiana

References

External links
OpenStreetMap - Kourou
HERE/Nokia - Kourou
OurAirports - Kourou

Airports in French Guiana
Buildings and structures in Kourou